The Convention on the Recognition and Enforcement of Foreign Arbitral Awards, commonly known as the New York Convention, was adopted by a United Nations diplomatic conference on 10 June 1958 and entered into force on 7 June 1959. The Convention requires courts of contracting states to give effect to private agreements to arbitrate and to recognize and enforce arbitration awards made in other contracting states. Widely considered the foundational instrument for international arbitration, it applies to arbitrations that are not considered as domestic awards in the state where recognition and enforcement is sought.

The New York Convention is very successful.  Nowadays many countries have adopted arbitration laws based on the UNCITRAL Model Law on International Commercial Arbitration. This works with the New York Convention so that the provisions on making an enforceable award, or asking a court to set it aside or not enforce it, are the same under the Model Law and the New York Convention.  The Model Law does not replace the Convention; it works with it. An award made in a country which is not a signatory to the Convention cannot take advantage of the Convention to enforce that award in the 169 contracting states unless there is bilateral recognition, whether or not the arbitration was held under the provisions of the UNCITRAL Model Law.

Background
In 1953, the International Chamber of Commerce (ICC) produced the first draft Convention on the Recognition and Enforcement of International Arbitral Awards to the United Nations Economic and Social Council.  With slight modifications, the council submitted the convention to the International Conference in the Spring of 1958. The Conference was chaired by Willem Schurmann, the Dutch Permanent Representative to the United Nations and Oscar Schachter, a leading figure in international law who later taught at Columbia Law School and the Columbia School of International and Public Affairs, and served as the President of the American Society of International Law.

International arbitration is an increasingly popular means of alternative dispute resolution for cross-border commercial transactions. The primary advantage of arbitration over court litigation is enforceability:  an arbitration award is enforceable in most countries in the world. Other advantages of arbitration include the ability to select a neutral forum to resolve disputes, that arbitration awards are final and not ordinarily subject to appeal, the ability to choose flexible procedures for the arbitration, and confidentiality.

Once a dispute between parties is settled, the winning party needs to collect the award or judgment. If the loser voluntarily pays, no court action is necessary. Otherwise, unless the assets of the losing party are located in the country where the court judgment was rendered, the winning party needs to obtain a court judgment in the jurisdiction where the other party resides or where its assets are located. Unless there is a treaty on recognition of court judgments between the country where the judgment is rendered and the country where the winning party seeks to collect, the winning party will be unable to use the court judgment to collect.

Cases and statistics 
Public information on overall and specific arbitration cases is quite limited as there is no need to involve the courts at all unless there is a dispute, and in most cases the loser pays voluntarily. A review of disputed cases in China found that from 2000 to 2011, the Supreme People's Court upheld the refusal to enforce the arbitration agreement in 17 cases due to a provision in Article V (China has an automatic appeal system to the highest court, so this includes all such refusals).

Summary of provisions
Under the convention, an arbitration award issued in any other state can generally be freely enforced in any other contracting state, only subject to certain, limited defenses. These defenses are:

a party to the arbitration agreement was, under the law applicable to him, under some incapacity, or the arbitration agreement was not valid under its governing law;
a party was not given proper notice of the appointment of the arbitrator or of the arbitration proceedings, or was otherwise unable to present its case;
the award deals with an issue not contemplated by or not falling within the terms of the submission to arbitration, or contains matters beyond the scope of the arbitration (subject to the proviso that an award which contains decisions on such matters may be enforced to the extent that it contains decisions on matters submitted to arbitration which can be separated from those matters not so submitted);
the composition of the arbitral tribunal was not in accordance with the agreement of the parties or, failing such agreement, with the law of the place where the hearing took place (the "lex loci arbitri");
the award has not yet become binding upon the parties, or has been set aside or suspended by a competent authority, either in the country where the arbitration took place, or pursuant to the law of the arbitration agreement;
the subject matter of the award was not capable of resolution by arbitration; or
enforcement would be contrary to "public policy".

Additionally, there are three types of reservations that countries may apply:

Conventional Reservation – some countries only enforce arbitration awards issued in a Convention member state
Commercial Reservation – some countries only enforce arbitration awards that are related to commercial transactions
Reciprocity reservation – some countries may choose not to limit the convention to only awards from other contracting states, but may however limit application to awards from non-contracting states such that they will only apply it to the extent to which such a non-contracting state grants reciprocal treatment.

States may make any or all of the above reservations. Because there are two similar issues conflated under the term "reciprocity", it is important to determine which such reservation (or both) an enforcing state has made.

Parties to the Convention
As of January 2023, the convention has 172 state parties, which includes 169 of the 193 United Nations member states plus the Cook Islands, the Holy See, and the State of Palestine. Twenty-four UN member states have not yet adopted the convention. In addition, Taiwan has not been permitted to adopt the convention (but generally enforces foreign arbitration judgments) and a number of British Overseas Territories have not had the Convention extended to them by Order in Council. British Overseas Territories to which the New York Convention has not yet been extended by Order in Council are: Anguilla, Falkland Islands, Turks and Caicos Islands, Montserrat, Saint Helena (including Ascension and Tristan da Cunha).

The convention has also been extended to a number of British Crown Dependencies, Overseas Territories, Overseas departments,
Unincorporated Territories and other subsidiary territories of sovereign states.

States which are not party to the Convention

United States issues
Under American law, the recognition of foreign arbitral awards is governed by chapter 2 of the Federal Arbitration Act, which incorporates the New York Convention.

Therefore, the New York Convention on the Recognition and Enforcement of Foreign Arbitral Awards (the "Convention") preempts state law. In Foster v. Neilson, the Supreme Court held "Our constitution declares a treaty to be the law of the land.  It is, consequently, to be regarded in courts of justice as equivalent to an act of the Legislature, whenever it operates of itself without the aid of any legislative provision." Thus, over a course of 181 years, the United States Supreme Court has repeatedly held that a self-executing treaty is an act of the Legislature (i.e., act of Congress).

With specific regard to the New York Convention, at least one court discussed, but ultimately avoided, the issue of whether the treaty is self-executing.  The court nonetheless held that the convention was, at the least, an implemented non-self-executing treaty that still had legal force as a treaty (as distinguished from an Act of Congress). Based on that determination, the court held that the Convention preempted state law that sought to void arbitration clauses in international reinsurance treaties.

See also 
 Hague Choice of Court Convention
Hague Judgments Convention

References

External links
 Uncitral
 1958 New York Convention Guide (This website was developed by Shearman & Sterling and Columbia Law School, in cooperation with UNCITRAL)
 New York Convention, gives access to information regarding the New York Convention in general, its history, its interpretation and application by the courts
 List of Contracting States
 Status. Convention on the Recognition and Enforcement of Foreign Arbitral Awards (New York, 1958) (updated whenever the UNCITRAL Secretariat is informed of changes in status of the convention.)
 The New York Convention on the UN Audiovisual Library of International Law, with an introductory note by Albert Jan van den Berg, video footage and photos related to the negotiations and adoption of the convention.
 ICCA's Guide to the New York Convention  (The International Council for Commercial Arbitration)

United Nations treaties
Arbitration treaties
Treaties entered into force in 1959
Treaties concluded in 1958
Treaties of Afghanistan
Treaties of Albania
Treaties of Algeria
Treaties of Andorra
Treaties of Antigua and Barbuda
Treaties of Argentina
Treaties of Armenia
Treaties of Australia
Treaties of Austria
Treaties of Azerbaijan
Treaties of the Bahamas
Treaties of Bahrain
Treaties of Bangladesh
Treaties of Barbados
Treaties of the Byelorussian Soviet Socialist Republic
Treaties of Belgium
Treaties of the Republic of Dahomey
Treaties of Bhutan
Treaties of Bolivia
Treaties of Bosnia and Herzegovina
Treaties of Botswana
Treaties of Brazil
Treaties of Brunei
Treaties of the People's Republic of Bulgaria
Treaties of Burkina Faso
Treaties of Myanmar
Treaties of Burundi
Treaties of the Kingdom of Cambodia (1953–1970)
Treaties of Cameroon
Treaties of Canada
Treaties of the Central African Republic
Treaties of Chile
Treaties of the People's Republic of China
Treaties of Colombia
Treaties of the Comoros
Treaties of the Democratic Republic of the Congo
Treaties of the Cook Islands
Treaties of Costa Rica
Treaties of Ivory Coast
Treaties of Croatia
Treaties of Cuba
Treaties of Cyprus
Treaties of the Czech Republic
Treaties of Czechoslovakia
Treaties of Denmark
Treaties of Djibouti
Treaties of Dominica
Treaties of the Dominican Republic
Treaties of Ecuador
Treaties of El Salvador
Treaties of Estonia
Treaties of Fiji
Treaties of Finland
Treaties of France
Treaties of Gabon
Treaties of Georgia (country)
Treaties of West Germany
Treaties of East Germany
Treaties of Ghana
Treaties of the Kingdom of Greece
Treaties of Guatemala
Treaties of Guinea
Treaties of Guyana
Treaties of Haiti
Treaties of the Holy See
Treaties of Honduras
Treaties of the Hungarian People's Republic
Treaties of Iceland
Treaties of India
Treaties of Indonesia
Treaties of Iran
Treaties of Iraq
Treaties of Ireland
Treaties of Israel
Treaties of Italy
Treaties of Jamaica
Treaties of Japan
Treaties of Jordan
Treaties of Kazakhstan
Treaties of Kenya
Treaties of Kuwait
Treaties of Kyrgyzstan
Treaties of Laos
Treaties of Latvia
Treaties of Lebanon
Treaties of Lesotho
Treaties of Liberia
Treaties of Liechtenstein
Treaties of Lithuania
Treaties of Luxembourg
Treaties of Madagascar
Treaties of Malaysia
Treaties of Mali
Treaties of Malta
Treaties of the Marshall Islands
Treaties of Mauritania
Treaties of Mauritius
Treaties of Mexico
Treaties of Monaco
Treaties of Mongolia
Treaties of Montenegro
Treaties of Morocco
Treaties of Mozambique
Treaties of Nepal
Treaties of the Netherlands
Treaties of New Zealand
Treaties of Nicaragua
Treaties of Niger
Treaties of Nigeria
Treaties of Norway
Treaties of Oman
Treaties of Pakistan
Treaties of the State of Palestine
Treaties of Panama
Treaties of Papua New Guinea
Treaties of Paraguay
Treaties of Peru
Treaties of the Philippines
Treaties of the Polish People's Republic
Treaties of Portugal
Treaties of Qatar
Treaties of South Korea
Treaties of Moldova
Treaties of the Socialist Republic of Romania
Treaties of the Soviet Union
Treaties of Rwanda
Treaties of San Marino
Treaties of São Tomé and Príncipe
Treaties of Saudi Arabia
Treaties of Senegal
Treaties of Serbia and Montenegro
Treaties of Singapore
Treaties of Slovakia
Treaties of Slovenia
Treaties of South Africa
Treaties of Spain
Treaties of the Dominion of Ceylon
Treaties of Saint Vincent and the Grenadines
Treaties of Sweden
Treaties of Switzerland
Treaties of Tajikistan
Treaties of Thailand
Treaties of North Macedonia
Treaties of Trinidad and Tobago
Treaties of Tunisia
Treaties of Turkey
Treaties of Uganda
Treaties of the Ukrainian Soviet Socialist Republic
Treaties of the United Arab Emirates
Treaties of the United Arab Republic
Treaties of the United Kingdom
Treaties of Tanzania
Treaties of the United States
Treaties of Uruguay
Treaties of Uzbekistan
Treaties of Venezuela
Treaties of Vietnam
Treaties of Yugoslavia
Treaties of Zambia
Treaties of Zimbabwe
1958 in New York City
Treaties extended to Greenland
Treaties extended to the Faroe Islands
Treaties extended to the Netherlands Antilles
Treaties extended to Gibraltar
Treaties extended to the Isle of Man
Treaties extended to Bermuda
Treaties extended to the Cayman Islands
Treaties extended to Guernsey
Treaties extended to Jersey
Treaties extended to Ashmore and Cartier Islands
Treaties extended to the Australian Antarctic Territory
Treaties extended to Christmas Island
Treaties extended to the Cocos (Keeling) Islands
Treaties extended to Heard Island and McDonald Islands
Treaties extended to Norfolk Island
Treaties extended to the Coral Sea Islands
Treaties extended to Surinam (Dutch colony)
Treaties extended to British Hong Kong
Treaties extended to British Honduras
Treaties extended to Macau
Treaties extended to Aruba
Treaties extended to French Algeria
Treaties extended to French Comoros
Treaties extended to French Somaliland
Treaties extended to French Guiana
Treaties extended to French Polynesia
Treaties extended to the French Southern and Antarctic Lands
Treaties extended to Guadeloupe
Treaties extended to Martinique
Treaties extended to Mayotte
Treaties extended to New Caledonia
Treaties extended to Réunion
Treaties extended to Saint Pierre and Miquelon
Treaties extended to Wallis and Futuna
Treaties extended to American Samoa
Treaties extended to Baker Island
Treaties extended to Guam
Treaties extended to Howland Island
Treaties extended to Jarvis Island
Treaties extended to Johnston Atoll
Treaties extended to Midway Atoll
Treaties extended to Navassa Island
Treaties extended to the Trust Territory of the Pacific Islands
Treaties extended to the Panama Canal Zone
Treaties extended to Palmyra Atoll
Treaties extended to Puerto Rico
Treaties extended to the United States Virgin Islands
Treaties extended to Wake Island
Treaties extended to West Berlin
Treaties extended to the British Virgin Islands